Sceloporus carinatus, the keeled spiny lizard, is a species of lizard in the family Phrynosomatidae. It is found in Mexico and Guatemala.

References

Sceloporus
Reptiles of Mexico
Reptiles of Guatemala
Reptiles described in 1936
Taxa named by Hobart Muir Smith